Bílá is a municipality and village in Frýdek-Místek District in the Moravian-Silesian Region of the Czech Republic. It has about 300 inhabitants.

Geography

Bílá is located in the Moravian-Silesian Beskids on the border with Slovakia. The Bílá Ostravice flows through the village and the Černá Ostravice flows on the northern municipal border. They merge there and form the river Ostravice.

Sights
The wooden Roman Catholic Church of Saint Frederick was built at the expense of archbishop Friedrich Egon von Fürstenberg in 1873–1874.

References

External links

 

Villages in Frýdek-Místek District